Old Novgorod dialect (also translated as Old Novgorodian or Ancient Novgorod dialect) is a term introduced by Andrey Zaliznyak to describe the dialect found in the Old East Slavic birch bark writings ("berestyanaya gramota"). Dating from the 11th to 15th centuries, the letters were excavated in Novgorod and its surroundings.

For linguists, Old Novgorodian is particularly of interest in that it has retained some archaic features which were lost in other Slavic dialects, such as the absence of second palatalization. Furthermore, letters provide unique evidence of the Slavic vernacular, as opposed to the Church Slavonic which dominated the written literature of the period. Most of the letters feature informal writing such as personal correspondence, instructions, complaints, news, and reminders. Such widespread usage indicates a high level of literacy, even among women and children. The preserved notes display the original spelling of the time; unlike some texts, they were not copied, rewritten or edited by later scribes.  

Today, the study of Novgorodian birch bark letters is an established scholarly field in Russian historical linguistics, with far-ranging historical and archaeological implications for the study of the Russian Middle Ages.

History
The first birch bark letter was found on July 26, 1951, by Nina Fedorovna Akulova. At least 1025 have been unearthed since, 923 in Novgorod alone. Almost all of them were written with styluses of bronze and iron, and never ink. The letters were preserved due to the swampy soil which isolated them from oxygen. Many letters are found buried amidst the layers under streets which were previously paved with logs.

Linguistic features
The short birch-bark texts are written in a peculiar Slavic vernacular, reflecting living speech, and almost entirely free of the heavy Church Slavonic influence seen in the literary language of the period. Some of the observed linguistic features are not found in any other Slavic dialect, representing important Proto-Slavic archaisms.

Zaliznyak differentiates the Old Novgorod features that were already known before the discovery of the birch bark letters and those that have been ascertained after their study during the last few decades such as the following:

 tsokanye
 secondary pleophony, e.g. мълъвити as opposed to мълвити
 retention of stem-final *x in Proto-Slavic *vьx- "all" (spelled вехь) whereas other Slavic languages have undergone the third progressive palatalization, e.g. вьхо
 lack of the Slavic second palatalization in root-final position, e.g. рукѣ, моги
 the change vl’ > l’, e.g. Яколь, Яковлев
 nominative singular masculine of o-stems -e, e.g. Иване, посаднике, хлѣбе
 genitive singular of а-stems in "soft" -ě, instead of the "hard" -y, e.g. бес кунѣ. The same substitution is found in accusative plural of o-stems and a-stems.
 replacement of "hard" и by their "soft" counterparts in other non-nominal cases, such as the dual and plural of the imperative, nominative singular masculine of the present active participle, and pronominal endings (e.g. тиxъ instead of *тѣxъ)
 absence of palatalization of the stem with the new -ѣ and -и desinences, as in Old East Slavic
 nominative-accusative plural of а-stems in -ě, e.g. кобылѣ, сиротѣ

Features of the Old Novgorod dialect ascertained by the philological study in the last decades are:
 lack of the second palatalization in root-initial position, e.g. кѣл-, хѣр-
 a particular reflex of Proto-Slavic *TьRT, *TъRT clusters, yielding TьRьT, TъRъT. However, in some dialects these yielded TroT, TreT.
 West-Slavic-like reflex of *TоRT clusters, e.g. погродье versus погородие
 the change ml’ > n’, e.g. емлючи > енючи
 no merger of nominative and accusative singular of masculines regardless of animacy, e.g. Nom. sg. погосте : Acc. sg. на погостъ
 Proto-Slavic *kv, *gv clusters were retained (as in West Slavic languages) instead of being transformed to cv, zv before front vowels as in other East Slavic dialects

Often the orthography is domestic (as opposed to bookish), using ъ and о on the one hand and ь and е on the other synonymously (about 50% of birch-bark documents from the mid-12th to the late 14th century).

The Novgorod material is divided by Zaliznyak into seven chronological groups:

Implications of Old Novgorod findings
According to Zaliznyak, the Old Novgorod linguistic features, instead of being merely isolated deviations, represent a bundle of peculiar isoglosses. The deviations are more abundant in older birch bark letters than in the more recent finds. This fact indicates, contrary to what may be  expected, that the development was convergent rather than divergent, with regard to other northern East Slavic dialects.

According to Zaliznyak, the discovery of Old Novgorod dialect suggests that earlier conceptions which held East Slavic as a relatively homogeneous linguistic grouping, have been dispelled by a view advancing it instead as an area of much greater dialectal diversity. Zaliznyak divides the East Slavic area into two dialectal groupings: Proto-Novgorodian-Pskovian on one side, singled out chiefly on the basis of two instances lacking second palatalization of velars and the ending -e in nominative singular of masculine o-stems, and all the remaining East Slavic dialects on the other.

Examples

A criminal case: Novgorod birch-bark letter no. 109
(between end of 11th century and 1110s; excavated 1954)

Original text (with added word division):

грамота ѡтъ жизномира къ микоуле
коупилъ еси робоу плъскове а ныне мѧ
въ томъ ѧла кънѧгыни а ныне сѧ дроужина по мѧ пороучила а ныне ка посъли къ томоу моужеви грамотоу е ли
оу него роба а се ти хочоу коне коупивъ и кънѧжъ моужъ въсадивъ та на съводы а ты атче еси не възалъ коунъ
техъ а не емли ничъто же оу него

Transliteration:

gramota otŭ žiznomira kŭ mikule
kupilŭ esi robu plŭskove a nyne mę
vŭ tomŭ ęla kŭnęgyni a nyne sę družina po mę poručila a nyne ka posŭli kŭ tomu muževi gramotu e li
u nego roba a se ti xoču kone kupivŭ i kŭnęžŭ mužŭ vŭsadivŭ ta na sŭvody a ty atče esi ne vŭzalŭ kunŭ
texŭ a ne emli ničŭto že u nego

Translation (with added explanations not present in the original text in brackets):

Letter from Zhiznomir to Mikula: You have bought a female slave in Pskov. And now the princess has arrested me for it. (Obviously she has recognized the slave as having been stolen from her, and Zhiznomir is somehow connected with the affair, maybe as Mikula's family member or business partner.) But now druzhina has guaranteed for me. And now send a letter to that man (whom you have bought the slave from) and ask him whether he has another female slave. (This other slave would have to be given to the princess for the time the stolen slave would be needed as "corpus delicti" in a lawsuit to find out who the thief was.) And I want to buy a horse and have the magistrate (the "prince's man") sit on it and initiate a svod (the legal procedure to trace a whole buying chain back to the original seller and ultimately the thief). And if you have not taken the money, do not take anything from him (i.e. the slave-trader, because otherwise the whole plan might leak out).

An invitation: Novgorod birch-bark letter no. 497
(1340s to 1380s; excavated 1972)

Original text (with added word division):

поколоно ѿ гаврили ѿ посени ко зати моемоу ко горигори жи коумоу ко сестори моеи ко оулите чо би есте поихали во городо ко радости моеи а нашего солова не ѡставили да бого вамо радосте ми вашего солова вохи не ѡсотавимо

Transliteration:

pokolono ot gavrili ot poseni ko zati mojemu ko gorigori ži kumu ko sestori mojei ko ulite čo bi este poixali vo gorodo ko radosti mojei a našego solova ne ostavili da bogo vamo radoste mi vašego solova voxi ne osotavimo

Translation:

Greeting from Gavrila Posenya to my brother-in-law, godfather Grigory, and my sister Ulita. Would you not like to give me the pleasure of riding into the city, not leaving our word? God give you happiness. We all do not leave your word.

See also 
 Novgorod Codex
 Onfim

References

Sources
Yanin, Valentin Lavrentyevich. Ja poslal tebe berestu... ("I've Sent a Birch Bark to You...") 3rd ed., with an afterword by A.A. Zaliznyak. Moscow 1998.
 
 

Old East Slavic
Russian dialects
Extinct languages of Europe
Extinct Slavic languages